Eduard Andrés Atuesta Velasco (born 18 June 1997) is a Colombian professional footballer who plays as a midfielder for Campeonato Brasileiro Série A club Palmeiras.

Club career

Independiente Medellín
Atuesta began his career at Independiente Medellín, playing 44 matches with the Colombian side between 2016 and 2018 and winning the 2016 Categoría Primera A title.

Los Angeles FC
He signed with Los Angeles FC on a season-long loan deal just weeks before their debut 2018 season.

Atuesta made his first appearance with LAFC in the inaugural El Tráfico derby on March 31, 2018, when he was subbed in during a 4–3 away loss to the Los Angeles Galaxy. He made his way into the starting XI for the first time on May 5 against FC Dallas, and scored his first MLS goal the following week in the 31st minute against Minnesota United on May 9, 2018. He was named Man of the Match by the LAFC supporters group, The 3252. Once in the starting lineup, Atuesta solidified his spot, starting all but one league match before spraining his ankle against Philadelphia Union on June 30.

On December 13, 2018, the club announced that they had signed Atuesta permanently on a three-year deal.

Palmeiras
On 13 December 2021, Atuesta was sold to Palmeiras, where he signed a four-year contract. In 2022, Palmeiras reached the semi-finals of the Copa Libertadores. Atuesta came in from the bench in the second leg of the semi-final against Club Athletico Paranaense.

International career
Atuesta played for the Colombia under-20 national team at the 2017 South American U-20 Championship. In August 2019, he was called into the Colombia under-23 national team for friendlies against Brazil and Argentina.

Personal life
Atuesta earned his U.S. green card in February 2019. This status also qualifies him as a domestic player for MLS roster purposes.

Career statistics

Club

Honours
Independiente Medellín
Categoría Primera A: 2016 Apertura

Los Angeles FC
 Supporters' Shield: 2019

Palmeiras
Recopa Sudamericana: 2022
Campeonato Paulista: 2022
Campeonato Brasileiro Série A: 2022

Individual
 MLS Best XI: 2019
 MLS All-Star: 2021

References

External links 
 
 

1997 births
Living people
Sportspeople from Santander Department
Colombian footballers
Colombia international footballers
Colombia under-20 international footballers
Association football midfielders
Independiente Medellín footballers
Los Angeles FC players
Sociedade Esportiva Palmeiras players
Categoría Primera A players
Major League Soccer players
Campeonato Brasileiro Série A players
Colombian expatriate footballers
Colombian expatriate sportspeople in the United States
Expatriate soccer players in the United States
Expatriate footballers in Brazil